Homo Sapienne, also known as HOMO sapienne or Last Night in Nuuk or Crimson, is a Greenlandic novel by  Niviaq Korneliussen, published in 2014 in the Greenlandic language. After winning a short story competition, Korneliussen was financially supported to write the novel over three months, but she wrote it in only one. It is about the lives of several LGBT characters in Nuuk, the capital of Greenland. While its subject matter was commended by reviewers, the novel had issues with pacing and tone; it received a mixed critical reception.

Background

Niviaq Korneliussen is a Greenlandic writer who grew up in Nanortalik, a village in the south of the island. She entered a short story competition held in Greenland for young writers in 2012, submitting a piece called "San Francisco". She won the competition, and was then asked for a novel by the publisher. She received financial support for three months from the Greenlandic government to write the novel, but she wrote it all in only the final month. Homo Sapienne (stylized as HOMO sapienne) was published in 2014 in the Greenlandic language, with one chapter in English. It was translated into Danish by Korneliussen, and separately into English (as Crimson and Last Night in Nuuk) and German. 

While most Greenlandic literature is traditionally focused on its geography and its modest living conditions, Korneliussen's novel is instead written in a stream of consciousness, occupied with the interior lives of its characters. The culture of the island is rather inflexible, resulting in Korneliussen drawing upon pop culture in the English language rather than in Greenlandic. The book documents LGBT life in Nuuk, the capital of Greenland. Characters in the novel include Arnaq, Fia, Inuk, Ivik, and Sara, all of whom are of undisclosed ages but perhaps in their twenties. Fia was also the name of a character in "San Francisco". Since Nuuk is a small town of some 17,000 people without an established gay subculture, the novel is set mostly in bars and in homes. 

Events for the novel included a class reading in celebration of a theme day for the North Atlantic region, where pizza was served and songs in regional languages were sung.

Reception
Homo Sapienne had a mixed reception. While its themes of LGBT identity were accepted by its Greenlandic audience, the details of familial abuse were not. The novel was criticised as immature and Korneliussen as lacking experience by Katharine Coldiron of the Los Angeles Review of Books, since it contains unnecessary material (such as a dramatis personae—a list of characters), the characters have similar voices, shallowness, and details of pop culture. Hannah Jane Parkinson of The Guardian said the book was clumsy, and there were major discontinuities throughout, some within the space of a single "fag break". The tone was also criticised by a reviewer for the Women's Review of Books as too colloquial. Despite the criticism they levied, Coldiron and Parkinson both found positive attributes in the novel. Coldiron said some of the novel had thoughtful narration, and "subtly" portrayed Greenlandic life "without much politicizing", while Parkinson said some of the prose was lyrically written.

Scholar Rozemarijn Vervoort wrote that Korneliussen's novel made her a "pioneer for a new generation of young Greenlandic authors". Similarly, Coldiron suggested that Western literary presses take into account more writers like Korneliussen, who write in underrepresented regions.

References

Citations

Bibliography

 
 
 
 
 
 
 
 
 
 
 

2010s LGBT novels
2014 Danish novels
2014 LGBT-related literary works
Arts in Nuuk
Greenlandic literature
Novels set in Greenland
LGBT culture in Greenland